"Delta Dawn" is a song written by musician Larry Collins and country songwriter Alex Harvey. The first notable recording of the song was in 1971 by American singer and actress Bette Midler  for her debut album. However it is best known as a 1972 top ten country hit for Tanya Tucker and a 1973 US number one hit for Helen Reddy. Though the song is attributed exclusively to Collins and Harvey, the melody of the chorus is in fact nearly identical to the Christian hymn Amazing Grace.

Content
The title character is a faded former Southern belle from Brownsville, Tennessee, who, at 41, is obsessed to unreason with the long-ago memory of a suitor who jilted her. The lyrics describe how the woman regularly "walks downtown with a suitcase in her hand / looking for a mysterious dark haired man" who she says will be taking her "to his mansion in the sky."

Reddy's recording in particular includes choir-like inspirational overtones.

The song's writing

Alex Harvey said he wrote the song about his mother:

Ten years before Harvey wrote the song, he was performing on TV and told his mother not to come, lest she get drunk and embarrass him. That night she died in a car crash, and Harvey believed it was suicide caused by his rejection.

Harvey suffered from guilt over the incident, for years, until a cathartic incident the night he wrote the song. He was at fellow songwriter Larry Collins' house, who was asleep while Harvey noodled around on his guitar. He believed his mother then came to him in a vision:

After writing the first few lines of the song, Alex woke Collins and they finished it together.

Recording history
The first recording of "Delta Dawn" was made by Harvey for his eponymous album released in November 1971. Harvey had performed as the opening act for Helen Reddy at the Troubadour, in January 1972, but at that time Reddy (who also was signed with the Capitol Records label) made no connection with any of Harvey's compositions.

Dianne Davidson sang backup for Harvey's recording. She was the first singer after Harvey to record the song and chart in 1971–1972.

Tracy Nelson also sang backup on Harvey's recording, and performed "Delta Dawn" in her live act.

Bette Midler
After hearing Tracy Nelson sing "Delta Dawn" at the Bottom Line in New York City, Bette Midler added the song to her repertoire.

During the time Tanya Tucker’s and Helen Reddy’s recordings of the song were being produced (see below), Bette Midler recorded "Delta Dawn" for her The Divine Miss M debut album, for which her bluesy version was planned as the lead single. Reddy's single was released June 1973, two days after Midler's. The preemption required a marketing change for Midler, so the original B-side "Boogie Woogie Bugle Boy" was shopped to radio, itself becoming a top ten hit.

Tanya Tucker
Before Bette Midler's recording, Nashville-based producer Billy Sherrill heard her sing "Delta Dawn" on The Tonight Show and wanted to sign Midler to Epic Records and have her record it. Upon finding that Midler already signed with Atlantic Records, Sherrill cut the song with Tanya Tucker, who was newly signed to Epic, and Tucker's version was released in April 1972; it reached number six Country that spring. 

While Harvey's original version started with the first verse, Sherrill suggested starting with the chorus instead, done a cappella – a term unknown to 13-year-old Tucker. This distinction became a signature of her version.

Helen Reddy
Record producer Tom Catalano created an instrumental track of "Delta Dawn." Catalano first offered the vocal track to Barbra Streisand, but she refused; after this he gave the vocal to Reddy.

Reddy's version, which added upward modulation to Tucker's cold intro and nonstop vocals throughout, entered the top ten on 18 August 1973, on its way to its lone week at number one on the main Billboard Hot 100 chart, on 15 September 1973. "Delta Dawn" was also the first of Reddy's six consecutive — and eight overall — number one hits on the Billboard Easy Listening chart.

Reddy had reached number two with both "I Don't Know How to Love Him" and "I Am Woman" in her native Australia; "Delta Dawn" became her first number one hit there, spending five weeks at the top of the Kent Music Report in August and September 1973. "Delta Dawn" also marked Reddy's only chart appearance in South Africa, reaching number 13 in the autumn of 1973.

Other recordings

 Waylon Jennings on his 1972 album Ladies Love Outlaws
 Loretta Lynn on her 1972 album Here I Am Again
 Other 1972 covers included those by Kitty Wells, Jody Miller, Bob Luman, and Nat Stuckey.
 The Statler Brothers on its 1973 Mercury album The Statler Brothers Sing Country Symphonies in E Major
 Nola Francis released a version of the song in 1973. It peaked at number 98 in Australia.
 Other 1973 covers included those by Sonny James, Dottie West, Teresa Brewer, and Ray Conniff.
 Scott Walker in 1974
 Dash Rip Rock on its 1991 live album Boiled Alive.
 Me First and the Gimme Gimmes on its album Ruin Jonny's Bar Mitzvah
 Debbie Rule on her 2015 album Texas Girls
Hellbound Glory on its 2017 album Pinball, although the location in the song was changed to the Sacramento River Delta.

Chart performance

Weekly charts

Tanya Tucker version

Helen Reddy version

Year-end charts

All-time charts

Certifications

Use in popular media

 On Friends, Monica Geller sang it at a piano bar where Mike Hannigan worked.
 Stone Cold Steve Austin gave the first verse his take on an episode of WWE Raw – notable for his failure to hit the high notes.
 Sonny and Cher performed it on their The Sonny & Cher Comedy Hour on CBS.
 Appeared in the movie Big Fan, starring Patton Oswalt.

Notes

See also
 List of number-one adult contemporary singles of 1973 (U.S.)
 List of Hot 100 number-one singles of 1973 (U.S.)

References

External links
 

1971 songs
1972 debut singles
1973 singles
Waylon Jennings songs
Tanya Tucker songs
Helen Reddy songs
Scott Walker (singer) songs
Number-one singles in Australia
Billboard Hot 100 number-one singles
Cashbox number-one singles
RPM Top Singles number-one singles
Columbia Records singles
Capitol Records singles
Song recordings produced by Billy Sherrill